Angra is a Brazilian power metal band formed in 1991. They have released nine regular studio albums, five EPs, and three live CD/DVDs to date. Led by Rafael Bittencourt, the band has gained a degree of popularity in Japan and Europe.

History

Formation
Angra was formed in November 1991 by Santa Marcelina Music College students vocalist Andre Matos and guitarists Rafael Bittencourt and André Linhares. They were joined by Bittencourt's former bandmate Marcos Antunes (drums) and bassist Luís Mariutti (ex-Firebox).

This line-up composed a number of the earliest songs, with Rafael Bittencourt and Andre Matos emerging as the main songwriters. Two of the first songs written were "Time" and "Angels Cry", which both featured on the band's first album. The song "Queen of the Night", composed by Matos and Bittencourt, was originally titled "Rainha" ("Queen") and had been one of the songs from Bittencourt and Antunes previous band. The song "Carry On" was composed by Andre Matos and brought to the band. In the beginning of 1992, André Linhares was replaced by André Hernandes. His stay was equally brief and Kiko Loureiro joined the band in late 1992. It was during Hernandes' time in the band that the song "Evil Warning" was written. Finally they added "Reaching Horizons"  by Bittencourt. These six songs resulted in a demo-tape Reaching Horizons that was released in 1993 through Limb Music in Germany.

Angels Cry

During the recording sessions for their first album Angels Cry, Marcos Antunes left the band. A number of session drummers, including Alex Holzwarth were used to finish the album. Ricardo Confessori was later installed as a permanent replacement. This line-up change established a stable line-up lasted from 1993 to 2000. Angels Cry was recorded at Gamma Ray guitarist Kai Hansen's studio in Hamburg, Germany. Besides Hansen, the album included guest performances by Heavens Gate guitarist Sascha Paeth and Dirk Schlächter.

The album was released in Brazil in 1993 through Eldorado Records and contained a number of classical influences as well as a cover of Kate Bush's "Wuthering Heights". The album had some success both in Brazil as well as Japan. The band were managed by Antonio Pirani, also editor of Rock Brigade magazine. Due to the album's success in Japan, the Evil Warning EP was released in 1994 through Victor, which included remixed versions of songs "Evil Warning", "Angels Cry", "Carry On" and "Wuthering Heights". In the following year the album was made available in Germany through Dream Circle, and in France by CNR Music.

Holy Land 

In 1996 Angra opened for AC/DC in Brazil and was invited to the inaugural Brazilian Monsters of Rock Festival. Following the festival, the band embarked on a Brazilian tour, with further dates in Europe in 1995. Holy Land - an ambitious project involving orchestration, choirs, and Brazilian rhythms - was released in 1996. The production was handled by Sascha Paeth and Charlie Bauerfiend. Holy Land proved successful and the Japanese Victor release, which included the bonus track "Queen of the Night", went gold. The band toured Japan for the first time following the album's success, while in France the single "Make Believe" was released. That same year the EP Freedom Call was released, containing cover versions of Judas Priest´s "Painkiller". After the tour in support of the album, the band released a six-track live album Holy Live, recorded in Paris in 1996. The Holy Box was released in 1998 by Lucretia Records (Italy), which included seven acoustic tracks.

Fireworks (1998-2000) 

In 1998 the band released the single Lisbon, followed by the album Fireworks, produced by Chris Tsangarides. Fireworks was a departure from Angra's earlier experimental sound, focusing more on a neo-classical metal sound and lacking the Brazilian rhythms that were included in Holy Land. The album was the first for the Steamhammer label and appeared in North America through Century Media. A lengthy world tour was set up in support for the album. The band appeared at the Buenos Aires edition of Monsters of Rock, while they co-headlined shows in Europe with Time Machine and Stratovarius in 1999. Bruce Dickinson made a guest appearance during the Paris show, while the band also performed at the Wacken Open Air festival.

Matos departure and Rebirth (2000-2004) 

During mid-2000 Angra split, parting ways with vocalist Andre Matos who took bassist Luis Mariutti and drummer Ricardo Confessori with him. In March 2001, the two remaining members, Kiko Loureiro and Rafael Bittencourt, announced the new line-up that included Symbols' vocalist Edu Falaschi, drummer Aquiles Priester and bassist Felipe Andreoli.

This line-up began recording instantly and the album Rebirth was released in 2001, produced by Dennis Ward. The album was both a critical and commercial success in Brazil and internationally, selling over 100,000 copies worldwide in less than two months. The album went gold in Brazil that same year. The EP Hunters and Prey was released in 2002 which included acoustic takes of Rebirth songs, as well as other new material, a cover of "Mama" by Genesis, and their first song with lyrics in Portuguese, "Caça e Caçador" ("Hunter and Prey").

Angra would play live in Japan, appearing in Rock Machine in Spain, Wacken Open Air in Germany and ProgPower in Atlanta, Georgia, which was their first visit to the United States. Following the tour, the band submitted their version of Kashmir to the compilation The Music Remains The Same (A Metal Tribute to Led Zeppelin).

Temple of Shadows (2004–2006)

Temple of Shadows recording sessions started in January 2004 at Mosh Studios in São Paulo, once again produced by Dennis Ward. The album featured guest vocalists Kai Hansen (Gamma Ray), Sabine Edelsbacher (Edenbridge), Hansi Kürsch (Blind Guardian) and Brazilian folk and fusion legend Milton Nascimento. Temple of Shadows was a concept album based around a character known as The Shadow Hunter and his saga which is described as "the saga of a crusader knight that ends up disputing the expansionist ideals of the Catholic Church in the eleventh century".

The band toured Brazil and Europe, headlining shows in Southern Europe throughout Spain, Italy, and France in February 2005. For the first time since its creation, the band played at a UK show at The Mean Fiddler in London, supported by DragonForce, and later joined Finnish band Nightwish for the Japanese dates in March. The band then went to Taiwan and after, for the first time, they played in Oceania, headlining shows in Australia. Angra resumed the Brazilian tour and then returned to Europe for the Lorca Roch Festival, Live in Italy and Bull Rock Festival, sharing stages with big heavy metal names like Iron Maiden.

Aurora Consurgens, management problems, Confessori's return (2006–2009) 

Later in 2006, Angra worked once again with producer Dennis Ward on their new album, entitled Aurora Consurgens, focusing on a non-concept album as Rebirth was. Instead, they pursued a close relative of the idea, a theme album. Also in 2006, Fábio Laguna composed a solo progressive instrumental album called Freakeys along with drummer Aquiles Priester and bassist Felipe Andreoli. In mid-2007, the band took a break due to an unresolved situation with its manager, who was also the owner of the Angra brand. As result, other non-resolved situations between the members arose, culminating in an indefinite hiatus until a solution was reached.

In 2008, singer Edu Falaschi was originally reported as saying that Angra "has been terminated," but this was later revealed to be both a misunderstanding and a misreporting of his words.  Edu later clarified what was meant by his earlier comments: "Angra is not done; we're taking a break, a pause. The band is going through some difficult management issues, and all of us are doing our best to get back on the road." In 2009, the band's official site was taken down. Instead, the home page announced that the site was under construction and news would be released soon. In March 2009, the band's official site announced the return of drummer Ricardo Confessori after a 9-year hiatus to Angra, replacing Aquiles Priester, who left the band to dedicate full force to his band Hangar. The band went out on tour along with fellow Brazilian band Sepultura during 2009.

Aqua and departure of Falaschi and Confessori (2010–2014) 

In the beginning of 2010, Angra started writing songs for their upcoming yet unnamed album due out in mid-2010. The album was composed partly at the members' houses and partly at Confessori's ranch, where they rehearsed and improved the arrangements of the new songs. In February, they came into Norcal Studios in São Paulo, to start recordings. The band members made home videos from the writing/recording process and released them to the fans almost weekly.

On July 5 the band unveiled the cover and track list of the new album, named Aqua. On July 10, the first single "Arising Thunder" was released. On July, 15 a new song, called "Lease of Life", was played for the first time on Brazilian radio station Kiss FM. The radio program featured an interview with Loureiro and Falaschi, followed by a high quality play of the song.

On August 11, Aqua was officially released in Japan and the Aqua Tour began with a series of pocket shows, being followed by a Brazilian tour through several venues around the country.

On May 23, 2012, Edu Falaschi issued an open letter in which he announced his departure from Angra. Despite not explaining why, he said he would focus on his future projects, including Almah. Management of the band approached Matos for a possible return, but he declined. Fabio Lione (ex-Labyrinth, Rhapsody of Fire) became the third vocalist for the band.

In 2014, drummer Ricardo Confessori announced he would end his second tenure with the band. He was later replaced by 23-year-old Bruno Valverde.

Secret Garden and Kiko's temporary split (2014–present)

In November 2014, the band announced their eighth studio album, Secret Garden, that was released on December 17 in Japan and on January 16, 2015 in Brazil and Europe. In September 19, 2015, Angra performed at Rock in Rio with special guests Doro Pesch and Dee Snider. A third, surprise guest was also announced mid-show: lead guitarist Marcelo Barbosa, who was revealed as Loureiro's touring replacement after the latter had joined Megadeth earlier in the year.

Former vocalist Andre Matos died on 8 June 2019. A heart attack was cited as the cause.

In 2021, the band released a graphic novel based on the history of the album Temple of Shadows, called "O Templo das Sombras".

Musical style

Their musical style has been described as power metal, progressive metal, and neoclassical metal.

Band members

Current members
 Rafael Bittencourt – guitars, keyboards, piano, backing vocals (1991–present), co-lead vocals (2012–present)
 Felipe Andreoli – bass, keyboards, piano, backing vocals (2001–present)
 Fabio Lione – lead vocals (2013–present)
 Bruno Valverde – drums (2014–present)
 Marcelo Barbosa – guitars (2015–present)

Former members
 André Linhares – guitars, backing vocals (1991–1992)
 André Hernandes – guitars, backing vocals (1992)
 Marco Antunes – drums (1991–1993)
 Andre Matos – lead vocals, keyboards, piano (1991–2000) (died 2019)
 Luís Mariutti – bass (1991–2000)
 Aquiles Priester – drums (2001–2008)
 Edu Falaschi – lead vocals, acoustic guitar (in Unplugged shows) (2000–2012)
 Ricardo Confessori – drums (1993–2000, 2009–2014)
 Kiko Loureiro – guitars, keyboards, piano, backing vocals (1992–2015)

Former support members
 Alex Holzwarth – drums (1993, studio)
 Fábio Ribeiro - keyboards (1992 – 1993, 1999 Fireworks tour)
 Fábio Laguna – keyboards, backing vocals (2001–2007, touring)
 Dio Lima (Opus V) - keyboards (2022, Rebirth 20th Anniversary Tour)

Timeline

Discography

Studio albums

Demos
 Reaching Horizons (Demo, 1992)

Extended plays (EPs)
 Evil Warning (1994)
 Live Acoustic at FNAC (1995)
 Freedom Call (1996)
 Acoustic... And more (1998)
 Hunters and Prey (2002) - No. 85 Japanese charts

Compilations
 Best Reached Horizons (2012) - No. 90 Japanese charts
  On The Backs of Angels (2018)

Live albums 
 Holy Live Recorded 1996 (1997) - No. 87 Japanese albums charts
 Rebirth World Tour – Live in São Paulo,recorded 2001 (CD & DVD, 2002) - No. 78 Japanese charts (CD); No. 156 Japanese charts (DVD)
 Angels Cry 20th Anniversary Tour, recorded 2013 (CD & DVD, 2013) - No. 80 Japanese charts (CD); No. 209 Japanese charts (DVD)
 Ømni Live, recorde 2018 (CD & DVD, 2021)

Singles 
 "Carry On" (1994)
 "Make Believe" (1996)
 "Lisbon" (1998)
 "Rainy Nights" (1998)
 "Acid Rain" (2001) (demo version)
 "Wishing Well" (2004) - No. 85 Brazilian charts
 "The Course of Nature" (2006) (free download only)
 "Arising Thunder" (2010) (free download only)
 "Lease of Life" (2010) (free download only)
 "Newborn Me" (2014) (free download only)

Music videos 

 "Carry On" (1993)
 "Time" (1993)
 "Make Believe" (1996)
 "Lisbon" (1999)
 "Rebirth" (2001)
 "Pra Frente Brasil!" (2002)
 "Wishing Well" (2004)
 "The Course of Nature" (2006)
 "Lease of Life" (2010)
 "Stand Away" (2013)
 "Storm of Emotions" (2014)
 "Final Light" (2015)
 "Black Hearted Soul" (2015)
 "Synchronicity II" (2016)
 "Silent Call" (2016)
 "War Horns" (2018)
 "Insania" (2018)
 "Black Widow's Web" (2018)
 "Light of Transcendence" (2018)
 "Magic Mirror" (2019)

References

External links 
 Angra official website
 
 

English-language musical groups from Brazil
Brazilian power metal musical groups
Brazilian progressive metal musical groups
Musical groups established in 1991
Musical groups from São Paulo
Musical quintets
1991 establishments in Brazil
Articles which contain graphical timelines